In enzymology, a beta-lysine 5,6-aminomutase is an enzyme that catalyzes the chemical reaction

(3S)-3,6-diaminohexanoate  (3S,5S)-3,5-diaminohexanoate

Hence, this enzyme has one substrate, (3S)-3,6-diaminohexanoate, and one product, (3S,5S)-3,5-diaminohexanoate.

This enzyme belongs to the family of isomerases, specifically those intramolecular transferases transferring amino groups.  The systematic name of this enzyme class is (3S)-3,6-diaminohexanoate 5,6-aminomutase. Other names in common use include beta-lysine mutase, and L-beta-lysine 5,6-aminomutase.  This enzyme participates in lysine degradation.  It employs one cofactor, cobamide.

Structural studies 

As of late 2007, only one structure has been solved for this class of enzymes, with the PDB accession code .

References 

 
 

EC 5.4.3
Cobamide enzymes
Enzymes of known structure